List of Midrasha and seminary programs :
 
See also List of yeshivas, midrashas and Hebrew schools in Israel#Midrashas.

Israel, Currently In Operation

Ashdod
Midreshet AMIT Be'er Asdod

Bat Ayin
Midreshet B'erot Bat Ayin

Beit Shemesh/Ramat Beit Shemesh
Bnos Chana 
Machon Maayan 
Tiferet

Ein HaNatziv
 Midreshet Ein HaNatziv

Elkana
Michlelet Orot

Hebron
Midreshet Hebron

Jerusalem
Bayit VeGan
Afikei Torah 
Darchei Binah 
Midreshet Moriah 
Gilo
Midreshet AMIT 
Givat Shaul
Machon Tal/Midreshet Ma'amakim  (Hebrew)
Har Nof
Ba'er Miriam 
Neve Yerushalayim
Binas Bais Yaakov Seminary 
Bnos Chava 
Me'ohr Bais Yaakov 
Michlelet Esther 
Midreshet Tehillah 
Kiryat HaYovel
Emunah V'Omanut 
Midreshet Yeud 
Kiryat Moshe
Midreshet Rachel V’Chaya 
Pninim 
Malha
Sha'alvim for Women 
She'arim College of Jewish Studies for Women 
Mattersdorf
Beth Jacob Jerusalem
 Havineini Bais Yaakov Seminary 
Old City
Midreshet HaRova 
Machon Roni 
Pat
Nishmat 
Ramat Eshkol
Bnot Torah (Sharfman’s) 
Ramat Shlomo
Machon Shoshanat Yerushalayim 
Ramot
Tikva 
Tomer Devorah 
Romema
Talpiot
Midreshet Lindenbaum 
Zichron Moshe
Ohr Chaya

Kiryat Malakhi
Nachlas Har Chabad

Migdal Oz
Migdal Oz

Ofra
Midreshet Shuva

Shvut Rachel
Midreshet Binat

Tel Aviv
Midreshet Aviv

Tsfat
Machon Alte 
Sharei Bina

Yerucham
 Midreshet AMIT Be'er Yerucham

Israel, Currently Closed
Bnot Shilo
Machon Gold

United States
Berkeley, California 
Oakland, California 
Contra Costa, California  
Tri-Valley/Tri-Cities, California 

Orthodox Jewish schools for women
 
Midrashot